John Kotz (March 27, 1919 – May 8, 1999) was an American collegiate basketball player and early professional, best known as the Most Outstanding Player of the 1941 NCAA tournament as a member of the Wisconsin Badgers.

Collegiate career

Kotz, a 6'3 forward from Rhinelander, Wisconsin, played collegiately at the University of Wisconsin–Madison from 1940 to 1943.  As a sophomore, Kotz led the Badgers to the 1941 NCAA Championship and was named the tournament's Most Outstanding Player.  He was an All-American in 1942 and 1943.  Kotz left Wisconsin as the school's leading scorer.

He was inducted into the University of Wisconsin Athletics Hall of Fame in 1991.

Professional career

After his standout career, he played professionally for the Sheboygan Red Skins of the National Basketball League in the 1945-46 season.

References

External links
NBL stats
UW Athletics Hall of Fame profile
UW 1941 NCAA Champions tribute site

1919 births
1999 deaths
All-American college men's basketball players
American men's basketball players
Basketball players from Wisconsin
Forwards (basketball)
People from Rhinelander, Wisconsin
Sheboygan Red Skins players
Wisconsin Badgers men's basketball players